The brush-tailed rabbit rat (Conilurus penicillatus) is a species of rodent in the family Muridae. It is found in Australia and Papua New Guinea.

Description 
The brush-tailed rabbit-rat is one of three Conilurus species that were extant in Australia prior to European colonisation, and represents the sole surviving species of the genus. The other two species, the white-footed rabbit-rat (C. albipes) and the Capricorn rabbit-rat (C. capricornensis), are now extinct. Morphological analysis established three subspecies of C. penicillatus, of which one is on Papua New Guinea and two are present within Australia: one on the Tiwi Islands off the coast of the Northern Territory, and another on the Australian mainland.

Behaviour 
The brush-tailed rabbit-rat is a semi-arboreal, nocturnal species that spends some of its time foraging on the ground. Individuals tend to den in trees such as Eucalyptus miniata and Eucalyptus tetrodonta, as well as hollow logs on the ground. The species makes use of smaller hollows and hollows that are closer to the ground, than other co-occurring and larger-bodied mammal species such as the common brushtail possum (Trichosurus vulpeculus) and the black-footed tree-rat (Mesembriomys gouldii). This may make the brush-tailed rabbit-rat more susceptible to predation and destruction by high-intensity savanna fires than these species.

Distribution 
The brush-tailed rabbit-rat has a small, poorly known distribution in Papua New Guinea, and a larger distribution within Australia. On the Australian mainland, the species has substantially declined, with a study in the Northern Territory finding that its extent of occurrence has declined by more than 65%. The same study found that the species is contracting towards geographic areas that are wetter and lower than where it was found historically. Population declines are not limited to the mainland, with one study finding a 64% reduction in trapping success on the Tiwi Islands between the year 2002 and 2015.

The brush-tailed rabbit-rat was formerly much more common and widespread than it is currently. The species has very few contemporary records from the Western Australian portion of the species distribution, but was formerly known from the Mitchell Plateau region of the Kimberley, with sparse records from other areas (e.g Prince Regent National Park). In the Northern Territory, there have been no mainland records from outside of the Cobourg Peninsula in more than ten years. The species was reintroduced to the Darwin region, however this reintroduction attempt failed and the species is also considered extirpated from Kakadu National Park (where many vertebrate species have declined despite the 'protected' status of the region).

Population genomic analysis of the two Australian subspecies found high levels of differentiation among populations, including between the Tiwi Islands of Bathurst and Melville. The same study showed a substantial reduction in relatedness among individuals over 5 km distances, although significant values of spatial autocorrelation of genotypes persisted for distances of more than 100 km. This suggests that individuals tend to disperse much smaller distances than the co-occurring northern quoll (Dasyurus hallucatus), for which significant spatial autocorrelation exists at 500 km. Genetic diversity of the brush-tailed rabbit-rat was found to be highest on Melville Island, followed by Cobourg Peninsula, and lowest on Bathurst Island and at the Mitchell Plateau.

References

Conilurus
Mammals of the Northern Territory
Mammals of Western Australia
Rodents of Australia
Mammals described in 1842
Taxonomy articles created by Polbot
Rodents of New Guinea